The 2011–12 PlusLiga was the 76th season of the Polish Volleyball Championship, the 12th season as a professional league organized by the Professional Volleyball League SA under the supervision of the Polish Volleyball Federation.

Asseco Resovia won their 5th title of the Polish Champions, the first title since 1975.

Regular season

|}

Playoffs

1st round
Quarterfinals
(to 3 victories)

|}

|}

|}

|}

9th place
(to 3 victories)

|}

2nd round
Semifinals
(to 3 victories)

|}

|}

5th–8th places
(to 2 victories)

|}

|}

3rd round
5th place
(to 3 victories)

|}

3rd place
(to 3 victories)

|}

Finals
(to 3 victories)

|}

Final standings

External links
 Official website 

PlusLiga
PlusLiga
PlusLiga
PlusLiga
PlusLiga